Qarah Quyun may refer to:
Qarah Quyun District
Qarah Quyun-e Jonubi Rural District
Qarah Quyun-e Shomali Rural District